Minuscule 12 (in the Gregory-Aland numbering), A137 (Von Soden), is a Greek minuscule manuscript of the New Testament, on parchment, dated palaeographically to the 14th-century.

Description 

The codex contains a complete text of the four Gospels, on 294 parchment leaves, with a commentaries. The text is written in one column per page, biblical text in 21 lines and text of commentary in 57 lines per page. The ink is brown.

A commentary to Matthew and John is of Chrysostom's authorship, to Mark of Victors, and to Luke of Bostra.

There is also another division according to the smaller Ammonian Sections, with references to the Eusebian Canons.

Text 

The Greek text of the codex is a representative of the Byzantine text-type, with a few alien readings. Aland placed it in Category V.

It was not examined by using the Claremont Profile Method.

The text of the Pericope Adulterae (John 7:53-8:11) is omitted.
The text of Mark 16:9-20 has a note of Victor's.

History 

It is dated by the INTF to the 14th-century.

It was added to the list of the New Testament manuscripts by Johann Jakob Wettstein, who gave it the number 12.

It was examined and described by Wettstein, Griesbach, and Paulin Martin. C. R. Gregory saw the manuscript in 1885.

The codex is located at the Bibliothèque nationale de France (Gr. 230) in Paris.

See also 

 List of New Testament minuscules
 Textual criticism

References 

Greek New Testament minuscules
14th-century biblical manuscripts
Bibliothèque nationale de France collections